The Cats is a 1968 crime film directed by Duccio Tessari, starring Rita Hayworth and Klaus Kinski.

Cast
 Giuliano Gemma as Jason
 Klaus Kinski as Adam
 Margaret Lee as Karen
 Rita Hayworth as Martha
 Claudine Auger as Barbara
 Serge Marquand as Jimmy
 Umberto Raho as Doctor

Production
The film had the working title of The Cats. The credits of the film state that the film is an Italian, French and West German co-production. Actor Dan van Husen stated that the film is actually an Italian-Spanish co-production with the initial title being Los Gatos. The film was predominantly shot in Spain, with opening sequences shot in the United States.

Release
The Cats was released in Italy as I bastardi on 30 October 1968 where it was distributed by Warner Bros.-Seven Arts. The film grossed a total of 702,781,000 Italian lire on its theatrical run in Italy. In 1969 it was released in France and West Germany on 25 May and 6 June respectively. The film was released on the Warner Archive Collection on DVD under the title The Cats.

Reception
A contemporary review in the Monthly Film Bulletin commented that the film was "no more than an updated Italian Western with all the familiar sadistic ingredients" and that "apart from a quite competently staged desert car chase, Duccio Tessari (who showed real flair in A Pistol for Ringo) directs as though he had never been behind the camera before"

See also
 Klaus Kinski filmography
 List of crime films of the 1960s
 List of Italian films of 1968

Notes

References

External links

1968 films
1968 crime films
Italian films about revenge
Films set in the United States
Films about brothers
Films about dysfunctional families
Films about earthquakes
Films directed by Duccio Tessari
Italian gangster films
Films shot in Almería
1960s Italian films